Kerry Johnson may refer to:

Kerry G. Johnson, American artist
Kerry Johnson (athlete), Australian female sprinter
Kerry Johnson (The Young and the Restless), a soap opera character